Arnulf Sunde (born 12 October 1951) is a former speed skater from Norway, who represented his native country at the 1976 Winter Olympics in Innsbruck, Austria. There he finished in sixth place in the men's 500 metres, together with the Netherlands' Jan Bazen.

Sunde competed for Gjøvik SK. His best performance at the World Sprint Championship was 21st place in 1972.

Personal bests

References
 Arnulf Sunde at SkateResults.com
  Skøyter i radio og TV 76, Åge Dalby and Steinar Nyborg, published by Per Sletholt & Co.

1951 births
Living people
Norwegian male speed skaters
Olympic speed skaters of Norway
Speed skaters at the 1976 Winter Olympics
Place of birth missing (living people)